WSQ can refer to:

 Wavelet Scalar Quantization, a fingerprint image compression algorithm
 Workforce Skills Qualifications, Singapore national continuing education and training system
 World Saxophone Quartet
 WSQ (journal): Women's Studies Quarterly, an academic journal
 W.S.Q. (album)